In Greek mythology, Ceto (or 'whale') may refer to three divine women:

 Ceto, a primordial sea goddess and daughter of Pontus (Sea) and Gaia  (Earth). She was the mother of the Phorcydes by her brother Phorcys.
 Ceto, a "naiad daughter of Oceanos" and thus one of the Oceanids. Her mother was probably the Titaness Tethys. Ceto bore Helios a daughter, Astris.
 Ceto, the Nereid of sea-monsters and one of the 50 sea nymph daughters of the "Old Man of the Sea" Nereus and the Oceanid Doris.

Notes

References
 Apollodorus, The Library with an English Translation by Sir James George Frazer, F.B.A., F.R.S. in 2 Volumes, Cambridge, MA, Harvard University Press; London, William Heinemann Ltd. 1921. . Online version at the Perseus Digital Library. Greek text available from the same website.
Hesiod, Theogony from The Homeric Hymns and Homerica with an English Translation by Hugh G. Evelyn-White, Cambridge, MA.,Harvard University Press; London, William Heinemann Ltd. 1914. Online version at the Perseus Digital Library. Greek text available from the same website.
Nonnus, Dionysiaca; translated by Rouse, W H D, II Books XVI–XXXV. Loeb Classical Library No. 345, Cambridge, Massachusetts, Harvard University Press; London, William Heinemann Ltd. 1940. Internet Archive
 Parada, Carlos, Genealogical Guide to Greek Mythology, Jonsered, Paul Åströms Förlag, 1993. .

Oceanids
Nereids
Naiads
Women of Helios